William Hardin "Navy Bill" Saunders (June 20, 1898 – March 13, 1950) was an American football player and coach.  He served as the head football coach at Colorado State Teachers College—now the University of Northern Colorado—from 1928 to 1931, at the University of Colorado at Boulder from 1932 to 1934, and at the University of Denver from 1936 to 1938, compiling a career college football record of 44–28–8.  Saunders played football as a lineman at the United States Naval Academy and was later a line coach at the Agricultural College of Colorado, now Colorado State University.  He died on March 13, 1950, at his plantation home in Grenada, Mississippi.

Head coaching record

References

External links
 

1898 births
1950 deaths
Colorado Buffaloes football coaches
Colorado State Rams football coaches
Denver Pioneers football coaches
Navy Midshipmen football players
Northern Colorado Bears football coaches
People educated at Maidstone Grammar School